Nithecus is a genus of true bugs belonging to the family Lygaeidae.

The species of this genus are found in Europe.

Species:
 Nithecus horvathi (Jakovlev, 1889) 
 Nithecus jacobaeae (Schilling, 1829)

References

Lygaeidae